Zeina Mina (born January 1, 1963) is a Lebanese Olympic athlete. She represented Lebanon in 1984 Summer Olympics in Los Angeles, California, and came in last in her heat in round one. She had a PhD in Sport Education and Management in 2015, and worked in 2017 as Manager of Sport Academy in Antonine University in Lebanon. Zeina is the CEO of Performance First Lebanon.

Olympic participation

Los Angeles 1984
Mina was the only female participant for Lebanon in that tournament among a total of 22 participant for Lebanon.

Athletics – Women's 400 metres – Round One

References

1963 births
Living people
Lebanese female sprinters
Heptathletes
Lebanese middle-distance runners
Olympic athletes of Lebanon
Athletes (track and field) at the 1984 Summer Olympics
World Athletics Championships athletes for Lebanon